The 1933–34 New York Americans season was the Americans' ninth season of play. The Americans again did not qualify for the playoffs. This was the fifth-straight season that they missed the playoffs and the eighth time out of nine seasons.

Offseason

Regular season

Final standings

Record vs. opponents

Game log

Playoffs
The Americans did not qualify for the playoffs

Player stats

Regular season
Scoring

Goaltending

Awards and records

Transactions

See also
1933–34 NHL season

References

External links
 

New York Americans seasons
New York Americans
New York Americans
New York Amer
New York Amer
1930s in Manhattan
Madison Square Garden